The Amedichi (Amediçi) is a river of Sakha Republic, Russia, a left tributary of the Aldan.

See also
List of rivers of Russia

References

External links 
 Article in Great Soviet Encyclopedia

Rivers of the Sakha Republic